Ronald Brown (7 August 1926 – 13 June 2019) was the Suffragan Bishop of Birkenhead from 1974 until 1992.

Brown was educated at Durham University. After a curacy at St Laurence Chorley he was vicar of Whittle-le-Woods. Following this he was vicar of St Thomas', Halliwell, Bolton and then (his final appointment before his ordination to the episcopate) rural dean of Ashton-under-Lyne. In retirement he continued to serve as an assistant bishop in the Diocese of Liverpool until 2003. Brown returned to live in Chester and died in June 2019 at the age of 92.

References

1926 births
2019 deaths
20th-century Church of England bishops
Alumni of Durham University
Bishops of Birkenhead
Royal Naval Volunteer Reserve personnel of World War II